House of Councillors elections were held in Japan on 7 July 1974, electing half the seats in the House. The Liberal Democratic Party won the most seats.

This election has been marked by polar opposite predictions by political commentators, some claiming that the LDP would see disastrous results following severe price inflation and the 1973 oil crisis, although as the election approached, others confidently believed the LDP would see marked success following shifts in forecasts. The results ended up somewhere in between, with the LDP falling down to 126 seats, exactly half barely holding onto a thin majority by enlisting the help of two LDP-aligned independents. The biggest winner among the opposition was the Japanese Communist Party, the only major party to see an increase in the popular vote. Its number of seats was doubled, thanks to skillful allocation of votes for specific candidates, with many JCP candidates spread equitably among the lower ranks of the national district results, instead of wasting many votes on a few candidates and thereby causing a few others to fell below the threshold. LDP factional infighting and the subsequent vote splitting ended up hurting the LDP severely, such as in the four-member Hokkaido district. Here, only two LDP candidates were fielded, but a conservative independent running against them caused the conservative vote to be split and all three failed to be elected, giving all of the seats to the opposition.

The election also weakened Prime Minister Kakuei Tanaka's standing within his own party. This was most evident when Kentarō Kujime, who belonged to the same faction as anti-Tanaka LDP politician and future Prime Minister Takeo Miki, ran as an independent candidate against the LDP-approved candidate Masaharu Gotōda in the Tokushima district and won (an event dubbed the "Awa War," after the birthplace of Miki). Along with Tokushima, the LDP also lost to the opposition in the single-seat district for Okinawa, but won in all of the other ones, instead seeing their losses in the urban districts with more seats, a typical situation for older Japanese elections. Despite all of this, Tanaka saw his faction increase in number of Diet seats, whereas both Miki and former Prime Minister Takeo Fukuda, another Tanaka critic, saw their factions decrease in power.

Results

By constituency

References

Japan
House of Councillors (Japan) elections
1974 elections in Japan
July 1974 events in Asia
Election and referendum articles with incomplete results